The Boyd Trophy is a silver model of a Fairey Swordfish, which was presented by the Fairey Aviation Company Limited in 1946, in commemoration of the work for Naval Aviation of Admiral Sir Denis Boyd, KCB, CBE, DSC RN.  It is awarded annually to the naval pilot(s) or aircrew who, in the opinion of the Flag Officer, Naval Air Command, has achieved the finest feat of aviation during the previous year.  It is held by the ship, station or establishment in which the winner(s) was/were serving at the time the winning feat was achieved.

References
Citations

Bibliography
 Ray Sturtivant, Squadrons of the Fleet Air Arm, Air Britain (Historians) Ltd. 

Fleet Air Arm